Eviphis hirtellus is a species of mite in the family Eviphididae.

References

Mesostigmata
Articles created by Qbugbot
Animals described in 1882